Verity Records is an American gospel music-focused record label, founded in 1994. The Gospel group operated by Provident Label Group, which in turn is owned by Sony Music Entertainment.

Artists 
 21:03
 Crystal Aikin
 Deitrick Haddon
 DeWayne Woods
 Donald Lawrence
 Donnie McClurkin
 Fred Hammond
 Kirk Franklin
 Jason Nelson
 John P. Kee
 Hezekiah Walker
 Marvin Sapp
 Kurt Carr
 Richard Smallwood
 William Murphy
 Byron Cage
 Deon Kipping
 Maurette Brown Clark
 Shea Norman 
 Yolanda Adams
 Israel Houghton

References

External links 
 Zomba Label Group
 Sony BMG Music Entertainment
 

American record labels
Gospel music record labels
Sony Music
Record labels established in 1994
Zomba Group of Companies subsidiaries